Harold Rudolph Keeling (March 14, 1947 – July 6, 2013) was an American college basketball coach and administrator.  He was a Division I head basketball coach at the University of Maine and Northeastern University, before becoming Athletic Director at Emerson College and commissioner of the Eastern College Athletic Conference (ECAC).

Keeling attended Bishop Dubois High School and Quincy University, where he played basketball and graduated in 1970.  In 1977, he began his coaching career as head coach of Bergan High School in Peoria, Illinois.  In 1980, he was hired as an assistant at Bradley University by head coach Dick Versace.  After a stint at Marquette, Keeling was named head coach at Maine in 1988 - the school's first African-American head coach.  In eight seasons at Maine, he compiled a record of 106–122 and led the school to its first 20 win season.  From there, Keeling was named head coach at Northeastern, where in five seasons he went 48–92.

In 2002, Keeling was named athletic director at Emerson College, where in his five years he added five varsity sports.  In 2007, he left to become commissioner of the ECAC, the first African-American commissioner of a major conference.

Keeling died on July 6, 2013, in Londonderry, New Hampshire. His daughter is Kara Keeling, a film and gender studies academic. Other children include, Harold Keeling, David Keeling, Lisa Keeling, Christopher "Kip"Keeling, Tina Keeling, and Cory Keeling.

Head coaching record

College

References

1947 births
2013 deaths
African-American basketball coaches
American men's basketball players
Basketball coaches from New York (state)
Basketball players from New York (state)
Bradley Braves men's basketball coaches
College men's basketball head coaches in the United States
Eastern College Athletic Conference commissioners
Emerson Lions athletic directors
High school basketball coaches in the United States
Maine Black Bears men's basketball coaches
Northeastern Huskies men's basketball coaches
People from Londonderry, New Hampshire
Quincy Hawks men's basketball players
Sportspeople from Rockingham County, New Hampshire
20th-century African-American sportspeople
21st-century African-American people